Fares Al Hatrash (born 20 February 1991) is a Saudi football player.

References

1991 births
Living people
Saudi Arabian footballers
Najran SC players
Al-Okhdood Club players
Damac FC players
Abha Club players
Al-Thoqbah Club players
Al-Qous FC players
Saudi First Division League players
Saudi Professional League players
Saudi Second Division players
Saudi Fourth Division players
Association football midfielders